Teleiodes kaitilai is a moth of the family Gelechiidae. It is found in Russia (the southern Ural and southern Buryatia). The habitat consists of taiga forests.

The wingspan is 14.5–16.5 mm. The forewings are fuscous, densely mottled with dark brown scales. Forewing markings are more or less distinct blackish-brown spots. The hindwings are fuscous. Adults are on wing from mid-June to mid-July.

The larvae possibly feed on Larix sibirica.

Etymology
The species is named in honour of Mr. Jari-Pekka Kaitila, who was the first to recognize that the specimens representing Teleiodes kaitilai, are not conspecific with Teleiodes saltuum.

References

Moths described in 2010
Teleiodes